is a Japanese manga artist. Writing and drawing gritty seinen manga about the Japanese underworld, he is best known for Ushijima the Loan Shark (2004–2019), which won the Shogakukan Manga Award and spawned several films and series.

Life and work
Manabe was born in Chigasaki, Kanagawa, where he was inspired to become a mangaka by reading Doraemon in primary school.

His one-shot Smuggler (2000) was about an illegal transporter of dead bodies getting in trouble with the yakuza and the triad killers. It was adapted into a live action film in 2011.

Dead End (2001–2002), in four volumes, is a dystopian cyberpunk story where mutated humans are used as weapons.

Manabe launched Ushijima the Loan Shark in Weekly Big Comic Spirits in 2004 and ended it in March 2019, after 46 volumes. The manga depicts the life and activities of a yamikin, a Japanese loan shark, in a detailed and realistic way. During the 2010s, it was adapted into a live-action TV series, which ran for three seasons, and four live-action films.

His Kujō no Taizai series has been serialized since October 2020.

Awards

References

External links
 
 

Living people
Manga artists from Kanagawa Prefecture
People from Kanagawa Prefecture
Year of birth missing (living people)